Alchemy has had a long-standing relationship with art, seen both in alchemical texts and in mainstream entertainment. Literary alchemy appears throughout the history of English literature from Shakespeare to modern Fantasy authors. Here, characters or plot structure follow an alchemical magnum opus. In the fourteenth century, Chaucer began a trend of alchemical satire that can still be seen in recent fantasy works like those of Terry Pratchett.

Visual artists had a similar relationship with alchemy. While some of them used alchemy as a source of satire, others worked with the alchemists themselves or integrated alchemical thought or symbols in their work. Music was also present in the works of alchemists and continues to influence popular performers.  In the last hundred years, alchemists have been portrayed in a magical and spagyric role in fantasy fiction, film, television, comics and video games.

Visual art

Jan Bäcklund and Jacob Wamberg categorize alchemical art into the following four groups: 

Within the first group are the illuminations and emblems found within the alchemical texts themselves.  Illustrations appeared in early works such as the Chrysopoeia of Cleopatra but were largely absent in medieval works until the mid-thirteenth century. In the early fifteenth century, significant pictorial elements began to appear in alchemical works such as the Ripley Scroll and the Mutus Liber. This trend developed further in sixteenth century emblems.  Inspired by the work of Horapollo, this allegorical art form was adopted by alchemists and used in the engravings of Matthäus Merian, Lucas Jennis, Johann Theodor de Bry, Aegidius Sadeler, and others.

The trend of depicting alchemists in genre works began with Pieter Brueghel the Elder (c. 1525-1569), and was continued in the work of Jan Steen (1626-1679) and David Teniers the Younger (1610-1690).

Alchemy has also played a role in the evolution of paint. Alchemists and pigment manufacture intersect as early as the Leyden papyrus X and Stockholm papyrus, and as late as Robert Boyle's Origin of Formes and Qualities (1666). The pigment recipes of artists such as Cennino Cennini and Theophilus have been influenced by both the practical and theoretical aspects of alchemy, and contained some allegorical and magical elements.

Modern art and exhibition
Some contemporary artists use alchemy as inspiring subject matter, or use alchemical symbols in their work. While alchemy is marginal to current visual art, alchemical thinking remains central. Some lesser known artists such as Brett Whiteley, Krzysztof Gliszczynski, and Thérèse Oulton openly use alchemical symbols. On the other hand, alchemical influences in the work of renowned artists such as Jackson Pollock, Marcel Duchamp and Salvador Dalí may be more superficial, and not the primary importance of the work. It is more the idea of alchemy, than alchemy itself, that has influenced these artists. Other examples of alchemy in modern art include:
Michael Pearce, Fama and The Aviator's Dream.
Adam McLean
Max Ernst
Odd Nerdrum
Matthew Barney, Ren (2008), Guardian of the Veil (2007) and Khu (2010).
Anselm Kiefer
Michael Maschka, The Alchemist (1995), Hermaphrodite (2016)
Reuben Kadish, A Dissertation on Alchemy (1937). Fresco in San Francisco.

Novels and plays

Like alchemy in visual art, the intersection of alchemy and literature can be broken down into four categories: 
The alchemical texts themselves;
Satirical attacks on alchemists;
Stories that incorporate alchemical iconography; and
Works that are structurally alchemical, known as literary alchemy.

In the first category are the writings of alchemists.  Beginning with Zosimos of Panopolis (AD 300) and extending through the history of alchemy, texts appear in the alchemical corpus that are more allegorical than technical. A much later example of this can be found in The Chymical Wedding of Christian Rosenkreutz (1616).

In the second category are critiques of alchemical charlatanism. Starting in the fourteenth century, some writers lampooned alchemists and used them as the butt of satirical attacks. Some early and well-known examples are:
	
Dante Alighieri, Inferno (ca. 1308 - 1321).
William Langland, Piers Plowman (ca. 1360–1387).
Geofrey Chaucer, Canon's Yeoman's Tale (ca. 1380).	
Ben Jonson, The Alchemist (ca. 1610). On it a butler is left in charge of a house and he uses it to commit crimes and becomes a swindler, at a point in the play is asked for help to obtain a philosopher's stone.
William Godwin, St. Leon (1799).

A number of 19th-century works incorporated alchemy, including:
Mary Shelley, Frankenstein; or, The Modern Prometheus  (1818).
Vladimir Odoevsky, Salamandra (1828).
Victor Hugo, The Hunchback of Notre-Dame (1831).
Goethe's Faust, Part 2 (1832).
Friedrich Halm, Der Adept, (1836)

In twentieth and twenty-first century examples, alchemists are generally presented in a more romantic or mystic light, and often little distinction is made between alchemy, magic, and witchcraft. Alchemy has become a common theme in fantasy fiction.

Literary alchemy
The term "literary alchemy" dates back to at least 1971, when Jennifer R. Walters used it as the title of her essay Literary Alchemy in Diacritics magazine. Stanton J. Linden, in his 1996 Darke Hierogliphicks; Alchemy in English Literature from Chaucer to the Restoration, applies the term both to stories which deal extensively with alchemists and the process of alchemy (of which the earliest is Chaucer's The Canon's Yeoman's Tale), and stories which include alchemical allegory or imagery (of which the most extensive and well-known is the Chymical Wedding of Christian Rosenkreutz). John Granger, who studies the literary alchemy in J. K. Rowling's, Harry Potter series explains:

In an early example, Sir Thomas Malory uses alchemy as a motif that underlies the personal, psychological, and aesthetic development of Sir Gareth of Orkney in Le Morte d'Arthur. Sir Gareth's quest parallels the process of alchemy in that he first undergoes the nigredo phase by defeating the black knight and wearing his armor. After this, Gareth defeats knights representing the four elements, thereby subsuming their power. In fighting and defeating the Red Knight (the overall purpose of his quest), he undergoes and passes the rubedo phase. Gareth, toward the end of his quest, accepts a ring from his paramour, Lyoness, which transforms his armor into multicolors. This alludes to the panchromatic philosopher's stone, and while he is in multicolored armor, he is unbeatable.

The Tempest is the most alchemically influenced of all William Shakespeare's work, steeped as it is in alchemical imagery (dying Kings and sons, Ariel as the spirit Mercurius etc.) with Prospero as the archetypal Magus. The main character in the play Goodnight Desdemona (Good Morning Juliet), by Ann-Marie MacDonald, succeeds in determining the alchemy behind Shakespeare's Othello. Literary alchemy continues to be popular in novels such as Paulo Coelho's The Alchemist (1988).

David Meakin, in his 1995 book Hermetic Fictions; Alchemy and Irony in the Novel is unusual in categorizing stories as alchemic even if they do not mention alchemists or alchemy, nor include alchemic allegory or imagery, so long as they include elements which obliquely remind him personally of alchemy. For instance, he considers any book about a writer alchemic, because "writing is a kind of alchemy." Captain Nemo's submarine the Nautilus is "alchemic" because it is a "hermetically closed cell" (all submarines are airtight, ergo "hermetically closed").  The game from Hermann Hesse's The Glass Bead Game is concerned with the quest for perfection of knowledge, therefore Meakin considers it "an intellectual alchemy." The list of authors who do not mention alchemy or alchemists, nor use alchemical allegory or imagery, but who use ideas which obliquely remind Meakin of alchemy include Charles Williams, William Godwin, Percy Bysshe Shelley, Émile Zola, Jules Verne, Marcel Proust, Thomas Mann, Hermann Hesse, James Joyce, Gustav Meyrink, Lindsay Clarke, Marguerite Yourcenar, Umberto Eco, Michel Butor, Amanda Quick, Gabriel García Marquez and Mária Szepes.

Music
Some Renaissance alchemists expressed their ideas through music. A similar trend continues today as some musicians express themselves using alchemy.

Heinrich Khunrath's Amphitheatrum Sapientiae Aeternae contains illustrations of musical instruments alongside the text, "Sacred music disperses sadness and malignant spirits", suggesting that music may have played a role in alchemical practice. The strongest example of music within alchemy can be found in the seventeenth century work of Michael Maier. His Atalanta Fugiens included fifty fugues.  The fugues were arranged in three voices symbolizing the philosopher's stone, the pursuing adept, and obstacles in his way. These have also been interpreted as corresponding to the alchemical tria prima. "It is the first alchemical Gesamtkunstwerk that comprises music, images, poetry, and prose together in one piece. As is stressed on the frontispiece of the book, all the senses are involved in contact with this treatise: partim oculis et inteflectui... partim auribus et recreationi... videnda, legenda, meditanda, intelligenda, dijudicanda, canenda et audienda. In this respect, Atalanta is a book that requires a rather contemplative exercise". The text of Maier's Cantilenae Intelectuales de Phoenice Redivivo is organized similarly, in three musical voices. Maier writes:

Alchemy continues to influence musicians. In more recent times, concept albums have been created around alchemical motifs.  Alchemy can be incorporated into song or album structure, cover art, and lyrics.  Some examples include:

Film, television, and webisode
Literary alchemy has been extended to film and television. The alchemical quest is plainly visible to the audience in movies such as The Holy Mountain (1973) and Milton's Secret (2016). The Vanishing (1988) is a less conspicuous example.  Based on The Golden Egg, this film features direct alchemical devices such as the appearance of the Mutus Liber.  More significantly, the plot can be seen alchemically, as the villain completes a twisted interpretation of the alchemical great work. In the American remake of The Vanishing (1993), the alchemical elements were stripped.

Alchemical influence may also be seen in  film adaptations of myths and legends. Evidence of an alchemical interpretation of Jason and the Golden Fleece can be found as early as the writings of John of Antioch (seventh century). The alchemical ties to this (and other) myths continued through to Renaissance alchemists, notably in the fifteenth century alchemical book Aureum vellus (Golden Fleece) attributed to Solomon Trismosin. Newer incarnations of these stories like Jason and the Argonauts (1963 film) have the capacity to carry forward alchemical allegory on film. Movies like the Harry Potter film series serve the same function for more recent fiction. 
	
Like other twentieth century forms of entertainment, movies and shows featuring alchemy often include elements of magic and fantasy. Sometimes this extends to magic realism as is in Parash Pathar (1958), and Hudson Hawk (1991). This same sort of portrayal can be found in science fantasy movies like 9 (2009), or in fantasy films like The Dark Crystal (1982). 2014's horror fantasy film As Above, So Below also featured these concepts.

Experimental film
 The experimental filmmaker James Whitney planned a series of four alchemical films in the mid-1970s. Of these only one was made, called Dwija (1976), described by William Wees as "an alchemical vessel dissolving and materialising again and again within a pulsating stream of coloured light."
 Jordan Belson and Harry Everett Smith also referenced alchemical ideas and imagery in their experimental films.
 The German experimental filmmaker Jürgen Reble has referenced alchemical processes in his physical and chemical manipulation of the filmstrip, describing one particular work, Alchemy, as bridging the gap between the "processing and fixing" of the film.
 In 2010 the moving image artist Richard Ashrowan created a video installation, Alchemist, which used texts by the twelfth century alchemist Michael Scot and included performances related to alchemical themes.

Graphic novel and animation
Alchemy and alchemical concepts appear in comics, as well as Japanese manga and anime in a fashion consistent with twentieth century fantasy fiction.  A few examples that feature alchemy heavily are:
The Fabulous Philosopher's Stone (1955)
Indiana Jones and the Iron Phoenix (1994)
Cyber Team in Akihabara (1998)
Fullmetal Alchemist series: Japanese manga series written and  published between July 2001 and June 2010. It is set in the early a fictional 20th century primarily styled after the European Industrial Revolution, with steampunk technologies and where alchemy is a widely practiced science, the series follows the journey of two alchemist brothers, Edward and Alphonse Elric, who are searching for the philosopher's stone to restore their bodies after a failed attempt to bring their mother back to life using alchemy. It also has two anime series; Fullmetal Alchemist (2003) and Fullmetal Alchemist: Brotherhood (2009).
Baccano! (2003)
Buso Renkin (2003–2006)
Animamundi: Dark Alchemist (2004)
Arcana Famiglia (2012)
Symphogear (2012-2019)

Video games
Alchemy is an element in numerous fantasy genre games. Characters can be portrayed or played as alchemists. Transmutation, spagyric potion making, homunculi, and alchemically created items may be incorporated into the gameplay. Games which include alchemical concepts include:

{{Columns-list|colwidth=30em|
Aidyn Chronicles: The First Mage
La storia della Arcana Famiglia
Atelier series
Code Realize (visual novel series)
Castlevania series
Chakan: The Forever Man (1992)
Darklands (1992)
Devil May Cry	
Dragon Quest series
The Elder Scrolls series
EverQuest (1998-)
Final Fantasy series
Fullmetal Alchemist 2: Curse of the Crimson Elixir
Fate/Stay Night: Alchemy appeared as a form of Thaumaturgy.
Genshin Impact
Golden Sun seriesGrimGrimoireHarry Potter and the Philosopher's StoneHaunting GroundICOIndiana Jones and the Emperor's TombKingdom Come: DeliveranceKingdoms of Amalur: Reckoning (2012)The Lurking Horror MabinogiMana Khemia: Alchemists of Al-RevisMarvel: Avengers Alliance (2012)MinecraftNeverwinter Nights series' and Neverwinter (video game)'
Noita (2019)
Opus Magnum
A Plague Tale: InnocencePokémon Sun and Pokémon MoonRagnarok OnlineThe Room (2012) and its sequelsRuneScapeSecret of EvermoreShadow of DestinyShadow of the ColossusShovel KnightSilent HillSpellboundStar Ocean: Till the End of TimeThe Last GuardianThe Sims 3: SupernaturalTomb Raider: The Angel of DarknessTomb Raider ChroniclesUltima Online (1997)The Witcher (2007) and its sequelsWorld of DarknessWorld of WarcraftZork Nemesis (1996)}}

See also
 Veiled Christ'', a 1753 marble sculpture by Giuseppe Sanmartino wrongly believed to have been created using alchemy

References 

 
Fantasy tropes